Lorenzo O'Brien (born 1955) is a Peruvian-American writer-producer of Irish descent.

O'Brien was born in Lima and attended graduate school at UCLA. He has produced many television films and several features including Walker and El Patrullero, which he also wrote.

O'Brien wrote and produced for the PBS series American Family.

References

External links

 

1955 births
Living people
People from Lima
Peruvian emigrants to the United States
Peruvian people of Irish descent
University of California, Los Angeles alumni